The following is a partial list of the "I" codes for Medical Subject Headings (MeSH), as defined by the United States National Library of Medicine (NLM).

This list continues the information at List of MeSH codes (I02). Codes following these are found at List of MeSH codes (J01). For other MeSH codes, see List of MeSH codes.

The source for this content is the set of 2006 MeSH Trees from the NLM.

– human activities

– activities of daily living

– automobile driving
  – automobile driver examination

– diet fads

– exercise

– leisure activities
  – holidays
  – recreation
  – camping
  – dancing
  – gardening
  – hobbies
  – play and playthings
  – video games
  – sports
  – baseball
  – basketball
  – bicycling
  – boxing
  – football (includes North American gridiron football and rugby football, but not association football (soccer))
  – golf
  – gymnastics
  – hockey
  – martial arts
  – tai ji
  – mountaineering
  – racquet sports
  – tennis
  – running
  – jogging
  – skating
  – snow sports
  – skiing
  – soccer
  – swimming
  – diving
  – track and field
  – walking
  – weight lifting
  – wrestling
  – relaxation
  – rest

– nudism

– physical fitness

– retirement

– survival

– temperance

– travel
  – expeditions

– work
  – work schedule tolerance

The list continues at List of MeSH codes (J01).

I03